France Daigle (born 18 November 1953) is a Canadian author of Acadian ethnicity. Born and raised in Moncton, New Brunswick, she has published nine novels and three plays. She writes in French and has pioneered the use of the Chiac in her written dialogue. She uses standard French in her narration.

She was awarded the 1999 France-Acadie award for her novel Pas Pire and the 2002 Éloize award for Un fin passage. She has written three plays with the avant garde theatre company Moncton Sable. She was formerly writer in residence at the University of Ottawa.

Daigle was awarded the 2011 Lieutenant-Governor's Award for High Achievement in the Arts for French Language Literary Arts. The following year she won the Governor General's Literary Prize in French fiction for her novel Pour sûr, the result of ten years of work.

Pour sûr was selected for the 2019 edition of Le Combat des livres, where it was defended by musician Édith Butler.

Publications 
 Sans jamais parler du vent, (1983)
 Film d'amour et de dépendance, (1984)
 Histoire de la maison qui brûle, (1985)
 La Vraie Vie, (1993)
 Real Life
 1953: La Chronique d'une naissance annoncée, (1995)
 1953: Chronicle Of A Birth Foretold
 Pas pire (1998)
 Just Fine (tr Robert Majzels, 1999, Anasi Press, winner of the Governor General's Award for French to English translation, 2000)
 Un fin passage (2001)
 A Fine Passage (tr Robert Majzels, 2001) (shortlisted for The ReLit Awards, 2003)
 Petites difficultés d'existence (2002)
 Life's Little Difficulties (tr Robert Majzels, 2004)
 Pour Sûr (2011), winner of the Governor General's Awards for Literary Merit for French fiction, 2012
 For Sure (tr Robert Majzels, 2013)
 Poèmes pour les vieux couples (2016)

Theatrical works 
 Moncton sable (1997) Moncton Sable Theatre
 Craie (1999) Moncton Sable Theatre
 Foin (2000) presented by Moncton Sable Theatre

References

External links
 Fonds France Daigle (R12025) at Library and Archives Canada

Canadian women novelists
Journalists from New Brunswick
Writers from Moncton
Living people
1953 births
Governor General's Award-winning fiction writers
20th-century Canadian novelists
21st-century Canadian novelists
20th-century Canadian women writers
21st-century Canadian women writers
Canadian novelists in French
Canadian women non-fiction writers